Francisco Casimiro Jerónimo Agnelo Pinto de Souza known as Francis Dsouza (4 October 1954 – 14 February 2019) was an Indian Politician from Bharatiya Janata Party (BJP) who served as the Deputy Chief Minister of the Indian State of Goa. He contested from Mapusa (Vidhan Sabha constituency) as an independent unsuccessfully in 1989.

Political career
D'Souza was first elected to the Goa Legislative Assembly in 1999 as the Goa Rajiv Congress Party's candidate and later in 2002, 2007, 2012 and 2017 as the BJP candidate from the Mapusa constituency. He was appointed Deputy Chief Minister when BJP formed a government in 2012 under Manohar Parrikar's leadership and remained Deputy Chief Minister when Laxmikant Parsekar became the Chief Minister. He was also front-runner to succeed Manohar Parrikar as the chief minister.

Controversy 
In July 2014, he landed into a controversy after publicly declaring that India is a Hindu nation and he was a Christian-Hindu.

Death
D'Souza died on 14 February 2019 at the age of 64 following a battle with cancer.

Positions held 

 1985 - Elected as the Councillor of Mapusa Municipal Council.
 1986-1988 - President of Mapusa Municipal Council.
 1995 - Elected as the Councillor of Mapusa Municipal Council.
 1998-2000 Chairman of Mapusa Municipal Council.
 1999 - Cabinet Minister of Law, Election and Urban Development
 2000-2002 - Cabinet Minister of Judiciary and Labour & Employment till
 2002-2005 - Cabinet Minister of Information Technology, Law & Judiciary, Legislative Affairs and Craftsmen Training.
 2012-2014 - Cabinet Minister of Urban Development, Revenue and Craftsmen Training
 2014-2019 - Deputy Chief Minister, Cabinet Minister of Health, Revenue, Town and Country Planning, Urban Development and Law, Legislative Affairs
 2017-2019 - Cabinet Minister of Urban Development, Law and Judiciary, Legislative Affairs and Provedoria.

References

1954 births
2019 deaths
Deputy chief ministers of Goa
People from Mapusa
Bharatiya Janata Party politicians from Goa
Goa MLAs 1999–2002
Goa MLAs 2002–2007
Goa MLAs 2007–2012
Goa MLAs 2012–2017
Goa MLAs 2017–2022
Goa Rajiv Congress Party politicians
Indian Roman Catholics